The following is a timeline of the history of the city of Lucca in the Tuscany region of Italy.

Prior to 18th century

 3rd C. BCE - Ligurian settlement.
 180 BCE - Latin colony established.
 90 BCE - Lucca becomes a municipium.
 56 BCE - Conference of political leaders Caesar, Pompey, and Crassus held in Lucca.
 343 CE - Roman Catholic diocese of Lucca active (approximate date).
 553 CE - Lucca besieged by forces of Narses during the Gothic War.
 571 - Lucca becomes an episcopal seat of the Lombards.
 713 - Walperto becomes Lombard .
 1004 - Pisa-Lucca conflict.
 1052 - Matilda of Tuscany in power.
 1057 - Anselmo da Baggio becomes bishop.
 1063 - Lucca Cathedral construction begins.
 1119 - Office of consul active.
 1147 - Basilica of San Frediano built.
 1197 - Lucca joins the Tuscan League.
 1314 - Uguccione della Faggiuola in power.
 1316 - Castruccio Castracani in power.
 1328 - death of Castruccio Castracani and triumph of the Guelph party; rule by Louis IV, Holy Roman Emperor begins.
 1329 - rule by John of Bohemia begins.
 1333 - rule by Marsilio, Pietro, and Orlandi de' Rossi di Parma, royal vicars of John of Bohemia begins.
 1335 - rule by Mastino and Alberto della Scala, Signori of Lucca begins.
 1341 - rule by the commune of Florence begins.
 1342 - rule by the commune of Pisa begins.
 1364 - rule by Giovanni dell'Angnello de' Conti, Doge of Pisa begins.
 1369 - Lucca resumes self rule under the Anziani of Lucca.
 1429 -  begins.
 1477 - Printing press in operation.
 1504 - Walls of Lucca construction begins.
 1578 - Ducal Palace remodelled.
 1584 -  founded.

18th-19th centuries
 1726 - Roman Catholic Archdiocese of Lucca established by Pope Benedict XIII.
 1790 - University of Lucca opens.
 1794 -  (library) opens.
 1805 - French client principality of Lucca and Piombino established.
 1806 - Consiglio municipale (city council) convenes.
 1815 - Duchy of Lucca established per Congress of Vienna.
 1819
 Teatro del Giglio (theatre) built.
  (school) established.
 1820 - Orto Botanico Comunale di Lucca (garden) established.
 1832 - Aqueduct of Nottolini built in vicinity of Lucca.
 1837 - Town Hall moves into the Palazzo Santini.
 1846 - Lucca railway station opens; Pisa–Lucca railway begins operating.
 1847 - Became one of the divisions of Tuscany.
 1883 -  begins operating.

20th century

 1901 - Population: 73,465.
 1905 - Lucca Football Club formed.
 1911 - Population: 76,160.
 1931 - Population: 81,807.
 1935 - Stadio Porta Elisa (stadium) opens.
 1972 - Mauro Favilla becomes mayor.
 1979 - Archivio Storico Comunale (city archives) established.
 1984 -  becomes mayor.
 1998 -  becomes mayor.

21st century

 2005 - Lucca Film Festival begins.
 2012 - Alessandro Tambellini becomes mayor.
 2013 - Population: 87,598.

See also
 
 List of mayors of Lucca
 List of bishops of Lucca (in Italian)
  (state archives)
 History of Tuscany

Other cities in the macroregion of Central Italy:(it)
 Timeline of Ancona, Marche region
 Timeline of Arezzo, Tuscany region
 Timeline of Florence, Tuscany
 Timeline of Livorno, Tuscany
 Timeline of Perugia, Umbria region
 Timeline of Pisa, Tuscany
 Timeline of Prato, Tuscany
 Timeline of Rome, Lazio region
 Timeline of Siena, Tuscany

References

This article incorporates information from the Italian Wikipedia.

Bibliography

in English
 
 
 
 
 
 
  (+ 1870 ed.)

in Italian

External links

 Items related to Lucca, various dates (via Europeana)
 Items related to Lucca, various dates (via Digital Public Library of America)

Lucca
Lucca
Lucca